Minuscule 665 (in the Gregory-Aland numbering), α 354 (von Soden), is a Greek minuscule manuscript of the New Testament, on parchment. Palaeographically it has been assigned to the 13th century. The manuscript is lacunose. Gregory labelled it by 222a and 277p. Scrivener labelled it by 213a and 251p.

Description 

The codex contains the entire of the Acts of the Apostles and Pauline epistles, on 149 parchment leaves (size ) with some lacunae (2 Peter 2:15-3:18; 3 John; Romans 10:17-1 Corinthians 1:7). The text of Romans 10:17-1 Corinthians 1:7 was supplied by a later hand.

The text is written in one column per page, 29-30 lines per page.

It contains Prolegomena, it has lectionary markings at the margin, liturgical books with hagiographies (Synaxarion and Menologion), subscriptions at the end of each book, numbers of stichoi, and Euthalian Apparatus to the Pauline epistles.

It contains additional material Journeys and death of Paul (as 102, 206, 216, 256, 468, 614, 912).

The order of books: Book of Acts, Catholic epistles, and Pauline epistles (Hebrews follows Philemon).

Text 

Kurt Aland the Greek text of the codex did not place in any Category.

History 

Scrivener and Gregory dated the manuscript to the 13th century. Currently the manuscript is dated by the INTF to the 13th century.

Currently the manuscript is housed at the Bodleian Library (Auct. F. 6.24), in Oxford.

See also 

 List of New Testament minuscules
 Biblical manuscript
 Textual criticism
 Minuscule 653

References

Further reading 

 

Greek New Testament minuscules
13th-century biblical manuscripts
Bodleian Library collection